The 2000 Limerick Senior Hurling Championship was the 106th staging of the Limerick Senior Hurling Championship since its establishment by the Limerick County Board.

Ahane were the defending champions, however, they were defeated by Patrickswell at the semi-final stage.

On 8 October 2000, Patrickswell won the championship after a 0-16 to 0-15 defeat of Doon in the final. It was their 17th championship title overall and their first title in three championship seasons.

Results

Relegation play-off

Quarter-finals

Semi-finals

Final

References

Limerick Senior Hurling Championship
Limerick Senior Hurling Championship